Roland Števko (born 8 April 1983 in Levice) is a Slovak former professional footballer who played as a striker.

References

External links
 

1983 births
Living people
People from Levice
Sportspeople from the Nitra Region
Slovak footballers
Association football forwards
MFK Ružomberok players
FK Senica players
1. FC Tatran Prešov players
Slovak Super Liga players
SpVgg Greuther Fürth players
Expatriate footballers in Germany
Slovakia under-21 international footballers